Baxendell is a surname. Notable people with the surname include:

 Jos Baxendell (born 1972), English rugby union player and coach
 Joseph Baxendell (1815–1887), English meteorologist and astronomer